This is a list of the Denmark national football team results from 1908 to 1929.

During this period, Denmark played 87 games. They played in four editions of the Nordic Football Championship in 1929-32, 1933-36, 1937-47 and 1948-51, but failed to win a single one.

1930s

1940s

References

External links 
 DENMARK - Overview of Official Internationals

1930s
1930s in Denmark
1940s in Denmark